Kazyrovo (Qaźır) is a rural locality (a selo) in Nikolayevsky Selsoviet, Ufimsky District, Bashkortostan, Russia. The population was 105 as of 2010. There are 7 streets.

Geography 
Kazyrovo is located 30 km northwest of Ufa (the district's administrative centre) by road. Kruchinino is the nearest rural locality.

References 

Rural localities in Ufimsky District